19th StLFCA Awards
December 18, 2022

Best Film: Everything Everywhere All at Once

The nominees for the 19th St. Louis Film Critics Association Awards were announced on December 11, 2022. The winners were announced on December 18, 2022.

Winners and nominees

Best Film
 Everything Everywhere All at Once
 The Banshees of Inisherin
 Elvis
 She Said
 Women Talking

Best Actor
 Brendan Fraser – The Whale
 Austin Butler – Elvis
 Daniel Craig – Glass Onion: A Knives Out Mystery
 Colin Farrell – The Banshees of Inisherin
 Paul Mescal – Aftersun

Best Supporting Actor
 Ke Huy Quan – Everything Everywhere All at Once
 Andre Braugher – She Said
 Brendan Gleeson – The Banshees of Inisherin
 Judd Hirsch – The Fabelmans
 Ben Whishaw – Women Talking

Best Original Screenplay
 The Banshees of Inisherin – Martin McDonagh (TIE) Everything Everywhere All at Once – Daniel Kwan and Daniel Scheinert (TIE) Decision to Leave – Park Chan-wook and Gong Seo-kyeong
 The Fabelmans – Steven Spielberg and Tony Kushner
 The Menu – Seth Reiss and Will Tracy
 Tár – Todd Field

Best Animated Feature
 Marcel the Shell with Shoes On
 Apollo 10 1⁄2: A Space Age Childhood
 Guillermo del Toro's Pinocchio
 Turning Red
 Wendell & Wild

Best Foreign Language Feature
 Decision to Leave • South Korea All Quiet on the Western Front • Germany
 Close • Belgium
 Happening • France
 RRR • India

Best Cinematography
 The Banshees of Inisherin – Ben Davis The Batman – Greig Fraser
 Nope – Hoyte van Hoytema
 Top Gun: Maverick – Claudio Miranda
 Women Talking – Luc Montpellier

Best Costume Design
 Elvis – Catherine Martin Black Panther: Wakanda Forever – Ruth E. Carter
 The Fabelmans – Mark Bridges
 Mrs. Harris Goes to Paris – Jenny Beavan
 The Woman King – Gersha Phillips

Best Score
 Women Talking – Hildur Guðnadóttir Babylon – Justin Hurwitz
 The Banshees of Inisherin – Carter Burwell
 The Batman – Michael Giacchino
 The Fabelmans – John Williams

Best Visual Effects
 Avatar: The Way of Water – Joe Letteri, Richard Baneham, Eric Saindon, and Daniel Barrett Everything Everywhere All at Once – Zak Stoltz, Ethan Feldbau, Benjamin Brewer, and Jeff Desom
 Nope – Guillaume Rocheron, Jeremy Robert, Sreejith Venugopalan, and Scott R. Fisher
 RRR – V. Srinivas Mohan
 Top Gun: Maverick – Ryan Tudhope, Scott R. Fisher, Seth Hill, and Bryan Litson

Best Comedy Film
 Weird: The Al Yankovic Story
 Everything Everywhere All at Once
 Glass Onion: A Knives Out Mystery
 Jackass Forever
 The Unbearable Weight of Massive Talent

Best Scene
 The Fabelmans – Sam Fabelman meets one of his idols on the studio lot Marcel the Shell with Shoes On – Marcel on 60 Minutes
 Nope – A tragic day on the set of Gordy's Home
 RRR – Piggyback prison escape
 Tár – Lydia bullies a Juilliard student
 Top Gun: Maverick – Iceman visits with Maverick

Best Director
 Sarah Polley – Women Talking
 Daniel Kwan and Daniel Scheinert – Everything Everywhere All at Once
 Baz Luhrmann – Elvis
 Martin McDonagh – The Banshees of Inisherin
 Steven Spielberg – The Fabelmans

Best Actress
 Michelle Yeoh – Everything Everywhere All at Once
 Cate Blanchett – Tár
 Danielle Deadwyler – Till
 Mia Goth – Pearl
 Emma Thompson – Good Luck to You, Leo Grande
 Michelle Williams – The Fabelmans

Best Supporting Actress
 Kerry Condon – The Banshees of Inisherin
 Angela Bassett – Black Panther: Wakanda Forever
 Claire Foy – Women Talking
 Janelle Monáe – Glass Onion: A Knives Out Mystery
 Carey Mulligan – She Said

Best Adapted Screenplay
 She Said – Rebecca Lenkiewicz; based on the book by Jodi Kantor and Megan Twohey, and on the New York Times investigation by Kantor, Twohey, and Rebecca Corbett Glass Onion: A Knives Out Mystery – Rian Johnson; based on characters created by him
 Guillermo del Toro's Pinocchio – Guillermo del Toro and Patrick McHale; del Toro and Matthew Robbins (story); based on the novel by Carlo Collodi
 White Noise – Noah Baumbach; based on the novel by Don DeLillo
 Women Talking – Sarah Polley and Miriam Toews; based on the novel by Toews

Best Documentary Feature
 All the Beauty and the Bloodshed
 Fire of Love
 Good Night Oppy
 Moonage Daydream
 "Sr."

Best Ensemble
 Women Talking
 The Banshees of Inisherin
 Everything Everywhere All at Once
 The Fabelmans
 Glass Onion: A Knives Out Mystery

Best Editing
 Everything Everywhere All at Once – Paul Rogers The Banshees of Inisherin – Mikkel E. G. Nielsen
 Elvis – Jonathan Redmond and Matt Villa
 Tár – Monika Willi
 Top Gun: Maverick – Eddie Hamilton

Best Production Design
 Elvis – Catherine Martin and Karen Murphy Avatar: The Way of Water – Dylan Cole and Ben Procter
 The Banshees of Inisherin – Mark Tildesley
 Black Panther: Wakanda Forever – Hannah Beachler
 Glass Onion: A Knives Out Mystery – Rick Heinrichs

Best Soundtrack
 Elvis
 Black Panther: Wakanda Forever
 Moonage Daydream
 Top Gun: Maverick
 Weird: The Al Yankovic Story

Best Action Film
 Top Gun: Maverick
 Avatar: The Way of Water
 Everything Everywhere All at Once
 RRR
 The Woman King

Best Horror Film
 Nope
 Men
 Pearl
 Scream
 X

Special Merits
 David Bowie – For the expansive and continuing cinematic presence of the singer-songwriter and actor, whose life and music continues to permeate and enrich the cinema landscape)
 Ashley Judd – For the bravery she demonstrated in portraying herself in She Said)
 Jafar Panahi – For the courage of the imprisoned Iranian director and all film professionals confronting political oppression in the pursuit of free speech, human rights, and artistic expression)

References

External links
 Official website

2022 in Missouri
2022 film awards
St. Louis
2022